Krutikovo is a rural locality (a village) in Dobryansky District, Perm Krai, Russia. The population was 13 as of 2010.

Geography 
Krutikovo is located 67 km north of Dobryanka (the district's administrative centre) by road. Nizhneye Krasnoye is the nearest rural locality.

References 

Rural localities in Dobryansky District